DNS Belgium is a non-profit organisation responsible for managing the ccTLD  top level domain, as well as the new gTLD domain extensions  and . Domain names are registered by the various agents of DNS Belgium, on behalf of their individual clients, as part of a decentralised registration and applications procedure.

Established in 1999 by the Internet Service Providers Association, Fabrimetal and the Belgium Telecommunications Users Group, DNS Belgium adopted this decentralised network of registrars on December 11, 2000 in order to create a simpler, automated procedure for the registration of domain names. Since 2003, the company has been party to a data escrow agreement, to ensure continuity of services. The organisation's name is derived, in part, from the term domain name server.  

DNS.be is a founder member of the EURid consortium which administers the  TLD, and provided the model upon which that organization is based.

References

External links

Domain name registries
Non-profit organisations based in Belgium